is a Japanese television personality, television presenter, and actress. She is a former member of the girl groups Keyakizaka46 and Hiragana Keyakizaka46 and current chairperson of the Tokyo Idol Festival.

Nagahama joined Keyakizaka46 in 2015 as the founding member of its subgroup Hiragana Keyakizaka46, and was briefly the only member of that subgroup. She left Hiragana Keyakizaka46 in 2017 and Keyakizaka46 in 2019, and returned to the entertainment industry a year later as a television presenter and actress. She was appointed the Tokyo Idol Festival chairperson in 2021.

Early life
Nagahama was born in Nagasaki, Nagasaki Prefecture. Between the ages of 3 to 7, she lived on Nakadōri Island, a remote part of Nagasaki in the Gotō Islands.

During high school, Nagahama appeared as a participant in the All Japan High School Quiz Championship, a game show for high school students. She advanced to the prefectural-level championships.

Career
Nagahama auditioned to be a part of Keyakizaka46; however, despite impressing the judges, she withdrew before the final round of auditions due to her parents' opposition. Later, her parents changed their minds after attending a Nogizaka46 concert in Fukuoka and allowed Nagahama to participate in the new group. With the support of the judges from the auditions, Nagahama officially joined Keyakizaka46 in November 2015 during the group's weekly variety show, Keyakitte, Kakenai? However, she was designated as the sole member of a subgroup named Hiragana Keyakizaka46 (けやき坂46, the exact same name but written in kana). Auditions for the subgroup began soon after.

Nagahama made her musical debut with Keyakizaka46's first single, "Silent Majority", though only appearing on a B-side song, . She made her first title song appearance in the second single, "Sekai ni wa Ai Shika Nai", and also sang a solo song, . Although eleven new members joined Hiragana Keyakizaka46 in May 2016, Nagahama was the only one to appear in songs by both the main group and subgroup. In consideration of both groups' increasing activities and the addition of nine second generation members to Hiragana Keyakizaka46 in August 2017, Nagahama left Hiragana Keyakizaka46 in September 2017 and became part of the main group full-time.

In December 2017, Kodansha announced that they will be publishing a photo-book featuring Nagahama photographed on the Gotō Islands, her hometown. Nagahama was the first member of Keyakizaka46 to release such a book. The photo-book, titled , sold 98,000 copies in its opening week, a record only topped by Mai Shiraishi's photo-book released earlier in the year. Her photo-book was also awarded by JR Kyushu for promoting tourism within Kyushu. Nagahama was also given the title "tourism ambassador" by Nagasaki.

Nagahama has appeared in all singles up until "Kuroi Hitsuji", and was also included in crossover groups such as Sakamichi AKB (with Nogizaka46 and AKB48) and IZ4648 (with Nogizaka46, AKB48, and Iz One). After the release of Kuroi Hitsuji in March 2019, Nagahama announced her resignation from the group, citing personal reasons. She officially left the group on 30 July 2019 with a farewell event at Makuhari Messe.

On July 7, 2020, Nagahama returned to the entertainment industry and joined the regular cast of the documentary/variety show , co-produced by Kansai TV and Fuji TV. She also launched her official website and Twitter account.

In July 2021, Nagahama was appointed the chairperson of the annual Tokyo Idol Festival, succeeding fellow former idol Rino Sashihara.

Nagahama is the Sustainable Development Goals PR ambassador for NHK, and also the host for the television network's sign language educational shorts, titled  and started in February 2022. She would make her asadora debut in Maiagare! (2022) as Sakura Yamanaka, who is a Gotō Islands native like herself.

Discography

Keyakizaka46

Other appearances

Filmography

Drama series

Variety and talk shows

Bibliography 

  (Kodansha, 2017)

References

External links 
  (July 7, 2020– ) 
  

1998 births
Living people
Japanese idols
Keyakizaka46 members
Musicians from Nagasaki Prefecture